Yager is a surname. People with the surname include:

Adelaide Yager Rameson (1892–1973), née Yager, American tennis player
Arthur Yager (1858–1941), governor of Puerto Rico
Arthur William Yager (1884–1967), Australian politician
Carol Yager (1960–1994), American woman and heaviest woman ever recorded
Henry Yager (before 1802–1860), farmer, businessman and political figure in Upper Canada
Henry Yager (footballer) (1874–1915), Australian rules footballer
Rick Yager (1909–1995), American cartoonist
William Overall Yager (1833–1904), American Civil War army officer

See also
 Yeager
 Yaeger